Edward Porter Williams (May 10, 1843 – May 4, 1903) was an American businessman who co-founded the Sherwin-Williams Company with Henry Sherwin.

Early life 
Born in Cleveland, Ohio, he graduated from Cleveland Central High School in 1859, then earned a bachelor's (1864) and master's (1869) degree from Western Reserve College (now Case Western Reserve University).

Civil War 
Edward and his brother Charles joined the Army in 1862, along with the entire Western Reserve College, faculty and student alike.  They were assigned to Company B, 85th Ohio and held a short-term assignment at Camp Chase guarding Confederate prisoners.  He mustered out at Columbus, Ohio, and had to be carried there on a cot, as he was recovering from typhoid fever.

Family 
Edward married Mary Louise Mason.  Their children were Edward Mason Williams (married Mary Redmond), Sarah Granger Williams (married Abraham Garfield), Lewis Mason Williams (married Lester Coffeen), Reba Louise Williams (married Arthur Douglas Baldwin), and Walter Williams.

Business 
In 1865, Edward and his brother Charles, along with Edward L Day entered the glass business in Kent, Ohio as Day & Williams.  He left that company in 1870, investing $15,000 to partner with Henry A. Sherwin.  Edward P. Williams was executive vice president and a member of the board of directors of the company at the time of his death.

Burial 
Edward Porter Williams is buried at Lakeview Cemetery in Cleveland, Ohio.

References

Further reading 

Sherwin-Williams Company (1955), The Story of Sherwin-Williams, Lakeside Press.
McDermott, Kathleen; Dyer, Davis. (1991). America's Paint Company: A History of Sherwin-Williams, Winthrop Group.
"Paint without pain", American Heritage, volume 17, issue 4, spring 2002. Retrieved November 11, 2010. Archived by WebCite on November 11, 2010.
"Sherwin Williams Co.", The Encyclopedia of Cleveland History. Retrieved November 11, 2010. Archived by WebCite on November 11, 2010.
"The Sherwin-Williams Company", International Directory of Company Histories (2008). Retrieved November 11, 2010. Hosted by encyclopedia.com.

External links 

1843 births
1903 deaths
Case Western Reserve University alumni
Businesspeople from Cleveland
Burials at Lake View Cemetery, Cleveland
19th-century American businesspeople